Useless Bay is a bay in the U.S. state of Washington. Part of Puget Sound, Useless Bay is located in Island County near the southern end of Whidbey Island, between Cultus Bay and Mutiny Bay.

Useless Bay was so named on account of frequent inclement weather.

References

Bays of Island County, Washington
Bays of Washington (state)
Landforms of Puget Sound